In computing, ver (short for version) is a command in various command-line interpreters (shells) such as COMMAND.COM, cmd.exe and 4DOS/4NT. It prints the name and version of the operating system, the command shell, or in some implementations the version of other commands. It is roughly equivalent to the Unix command uname.

Implementations

The command is available in FLEX, HDOS, DOS, FlexOS, SpartaDOS X, 4690 OS, OS/2, Windows, and ReactOS. It is also available in the open-source MS-DOS emulator DOSBox, in the KolibriOS Shell and in the EFI shell.

TSC FLEX
In TSC's FLEX operating system, the VER command is used to display the version number of a utility or program. In some versions the command is called VERSION.

DOS
The command is available in MS-DOS versions 2 and later.
MS-DOS versions up to 6.22 typically derive the DOS version from the DOS kernel.  This may be different from the string printed on start-up.  The argument "/r" can be added to give more information and to list whether DOS is running in the HMA (high memory area).

PC DOS typically derives the version from an internal string in command.com (so PC DOS 6.1 command.com reports the version as 6.10, although the kernel version is 6.00.)

DR DOS 6.0 also includes an implementation of the  command. DR-DOS reports whatever value the environment variable OSVER reports.

PTS-DOS includes an implementation of this command that can display, modify, and restore the DOS version number.

IBM OS/2
OS/2 command.com reports an internal string, with the OS/2 version.  The underlying kernel here is 5.00, but modified to report x0.xx (where x.xx is the OS/2 version).

Microsoft Windows

Windows 9x command.com report a string from inside command.com.  The build version (e.g. 2222), is also derived from there.

Windows NT command.com reports either the 32-bit processor string (4nt, cmd), or under some loads, MS-DOS 5.00.500, (for all builds).  The underlying kernel reports 5.00 or 5.50 depending on the interrupt. MS-DOS 5.00 commands run unmodified on NT.

Microsoft Windows also includes a GUI (Windows dialog) variant of the command called winver, which shows the Service Pack or Windows Update installed (if any) as well as the version. In Windows before Windows for Workgroups 3.11, running winver from DOS reported an embedded string in winver.exe.

Windows also includes the setver command that is used to set the version number that the MS-DOS subsystem (NTVDM) reports to a DOS program. This command is not available on Windows XP 64-Bit Edition.

DOSBox
In DOSBox, the command is used to view and set the reported DOS version. It also displays the running DOSBox version. 
The syntax to set the reported DOS version is the following:

 VER SET <MAJOR> [MINOR]

The parameter MAJOR is the number before the period, and MINOR is what comes after. 
Versions can range from 0.0 to 255.255. Any values over 255 will loop from zero. (That is, 256=0, 257=1, 258=2, etc.)

Others
AmigaDOS provides a version command. It displays the current version number of the Kickstart and Workbench. The DEC OS/8 CCL ver command prints the version numbers of both the OS/8 Keyboard Monitor and CCL.

Syntax
C:\WINDOWS\system32>ver

Microsoft Windows [Version 10.0.10586]
Some versions of MS-DOS support an undocumented /r switch, which will show the revision as well as the version.

Version list
The following table lists version numbers from various Microsoft operating systems:

See also
 Comparison of Microsoft Windows versions
 List of DOS commands
 uname

References

Further reading

External links

ver | Microsoft Docs
How to find Windows version, service pack number and edition from CMD
How to determine what version of Windows you are running in a batch file

Internal DOS commands
MSX-DOS commands
OS/2 commands
ReactOS commands
Windows commands
Microcomputer software
Windows administration